The 2003 Tour de France was a multiple stage bicycle race held from 5 to 27 July, and the 90th edition of the Tour de France. It has no overall winner—although American cyclist Lance Armstrong originally won the event, the United States Anti-Doping Agency announced in August 2012 that they had disqualified Armstrong from all his results since 1998, including his seven Tour de France wins from 1999 to 2005; the Union Cycliste Internationale has confirmed this verdict.

The event started and ended in Paris, covering  proceeding clockwise in twenty stages around France, including six major mountain stages. Due to the centennial celebration, this edition of the tour was raced entirely in France and did not enter neighboring countries.

In the centenary year of the race the route recreated, in part, that of 1903. There was a special Centenaire Classement prize for the best-placed in each of the six stage finishes which match the 1903 tour – Lyon, Marseille, Toulouse, Bordeaux, Nantes and Paris. It was won by Stuart O'Grady, with Thor Hushovd in second place. The 2003 Tour was honored with the Prince of Asturias Award for Sport.

Of the 198 riders the favourite was again Armstrong, aiming for a record equalling fifth win. Before the race, it was believed that his main rivals would include Iban Mayo, Aitor González, Tyler Hamilton, Ivan Basso, Gilberto Simoni, Jan Ullrich, and Joseba Beloki but Armstrong was the odds-on favourite. Though he did go on to win the race, it is statistically, and by Armstrong's own admission, his weakest Tour from his seven-year period of dominance over the race.

Teams

The team selection was done in three rounds: in November 2002, the fourteen highest-ranking Union Cycliste Internationale (UCI) teams would automatically qualify; four wildcard invitations were given in January 2003, and four more in mid-May. The race started with 22 teams of 9 cyclists.

The teams entering the race were:

Qualified teams

 
 
 
 
 
 
 
 
 
 
 
 
 
 

Invited teams

Pre-race favourites
Especially the absence of Cipollini, the reigning world champion, came as a surprise. The Tour organisation gave the reason that Cipollini had never been able to finish the race.

In the first round, the Coast team had been selected to compete, and in January 2003 they signed Jan Ullrich. Financial problems then almost prevented the team from starting, but after Bianchi stepped in as a new sponsor, Team Bianchi was allowed to take the place of Team Coast.

Route and stages

Race overview

The Tour proved to be one more hotly contested than the previous years. Tyler Hamilton and Levi Leipheimer were involved in a crash early in the Tour. Leipheimer dropped out, Hamilton continued and got fourth place in the end while riding with a broken collarbone.

In the Alps, Gilberto Simoni and Stefano Garzelli, first and second in the Giro d'Italia earlier the same year, could not keep up with Lance Armstrong and the other favourites. The same held for last year's number 4, Santiago Botero. Joseba Beloki could, and was in second-place overall (just 40 seconds behind Armstrong) when he crashed on a fast descent from the Cote de La Rochette, shortly after passing the Col de Manse into Gap. The crash was a result of a locked brake, caused by a lack of traction from melting tar on the road, which led to the tyre coming off the rim. Beloki broke his right femur, elbow and wrist, and had to leave the Tour. Armstrong made a detour through the field beside the road to avoid the fallen Beloki. Armstrong was in yellow, but Jan Ullrich won the first time trial by one minute and 36 seconds.  He and Alexander Vinokourov were both within very short distance from Armstrong.

Doping

Subsequent to Armstrong's statement to withdraw his fight against United States Anti-Doping Agency's (USADA) charges, on 24 August 2012, the USADA said it would ban Armstrong for life and stripped him of his record seven Tour de France titles. Later that day it was confirmed in a USADA statement that Armstrong was banned for life and would be disqualified from any and all competitive results obtained on and subsequent to 1 August 1998, including forfeiture of any medals, titles, winnings, finishes, points and prizes. On 22 October 2012, the Union Cycliste Internationale endorsed the USADA sanctions, and decided not to award victories to any other rider or upgrade other placings in any of the affected events.

Classification leadership and minor prizes

There were four main individual classifications contested in the 2003 Tour de France, as well as a team competition. The most important was the general classification, which was calculated by adding each rider's finishing times on each stage. There were time bonuses given at the end of each mass start stage. If a crash had happened within the final  of a stage, not including time trials and summit finishes, the riders involved would have received the same time as the group they were in when the crash occurred. The rider with the lowest cumulative time was the winner of the general classification and was considered the overall winner of the Tour. The rider leading the classification wore a yellow jersey.

The second classification was the points classification. Riders received points for finishing in the highest positions in a stage finish, or in intermediate sprints during the stage. The points available for each stage finish were determined by the stage's type. The leader was identified by a green jersey.

The third classification was the mountains classification. Most stages of the race included one or more categorised climbs, in which points were awarded to the riders that reached the summit first. The climbs were categorised as fourth-, third-, second- or first-category and hors catégorie, with the more difficult climbs rated lower. The leader wore a white jersey with red polka dots.

The final individual classification was the young rider classification. This was calculated the same way as the general classification, but the classification was restricted to riders who were born on or after 1 January 1977. The leader wore a white jersey.

The final classification was a team classification. This was calculated using the finishing times of the best three riders per team on each stage; the leading team was the team with the lowest cumulative time.

There was special classification, the Centenaire, which combined times of riders across the six stages involving cities visited during 1903 Tour. The cities were: Lyon, on stage 6; Marseille, on stage 10; Toulouse, on stage 11; Bordeaux, on stage 17; Nantes, on stage 19; and Paris, on stage 20.

In addition, there was a combativity award given after each mass start stage to the rider considered, by a jury, to have "shown the greatest effort and demonstrated the greatest sporting spirit". The winner wore a red number bib the following stage. At the conclusion of the Tour, Alexander Vinokourov won the overall super-combativity award.

There were also two special awards each with a prize of €5000, the Souvenir Henri Desgrange, given in honour of Tour founder and first race director Henri Desgrange to the first rider to pass the summit of the Col du Galibier on stage 8, and the Souvenir Jacques Goddet, given in honour of the second director Jacques Goddet to the first rider to pass the summit of the Col du Tourmalet on stage 15. Stefano Garzelli won the Henri Desgrange and Sylvain Chavanel won the Jacques Goddet.

In stage 1, David Millar wore the green jersey.
In stage 8, Rolf Aldag wore the polka-dot jersey.

Final standings

General classification

Points classification

Mountains classification

Young rider classification

Team classification

Centenaire classification

Notes

References

Bibliography

Further reading

External links

 
 2003 Tour de France at Cyclingnews.com

 
2003 in French sport
2003
July 2003 sports events in France